The following list is of comets with very long orbital periods, defined as between 200 and 1000 years. These comets come from the Kuiper belt and scattered disk, beyond the orbit of Pluto, with possible origins in the Oort cloud for many. For comets with an orbital period of over 1000 years, see the List of near-parabolic comets.

See also 
 List of comets by type
 List of hyperbolic comets
 List of numbered comets
 List of periodic comets

References

long period comets
List